Alfredo Luxoro (1859–1918) was an Italian painter, mainly of landscapes, genre, and orientalist themes.

Biography
Born in Genoa, he was the son of Tammar, a professor of landscape painting at the Academy of Fine Arts (Accademia Ligustica) of Genoa. He was influenced by the painters of the School of Rivara. He displayed one of his first works, Al mare, at the Florentine Mostra of 1877, the next year at the Genoese Promotrice, Fra gli scogli di Quinto. In 1889 at Turin, he exhibited Le sue marine and A prua e A poppa. In 1881 at Milan, he exhibited Nettuno, a seascape; and a half-figure of a man titled Cipollaro. In 1883 in Rome, he exhibited Alla marina; and in 1884 at Turin, a painting titled Grigio. He also painted Spes, a genre work of melancholy depicting a woman sitting by the seashore. At the same exhibition he displayed another canvas titled Ship Light.
He also painted portraits including that of the painter Niccolo Barabino. He  painted frescoes in the parish church of Carcare, and for the Chamber of Commerce and the Prefecture of Genoa. In 1899, upon the death of his father, he assumed direction of the teaching of landscape painting at the Accademia Ligustica.

In 1905, after long delays, the Chiossone Museum of Oriental Art was opened in Genoa by Alfredo, and Pica presented it to public on the magazine Emporium.

See also
 List of Orientalist artists
 Orientalism

References

Franco Dioli, Repertorio illustrato dei pittori, degli scultori e dei ceramisti liguri tra '800 e '900 a cura di IDAL800900 Istituto Documentazione Arte Ligure dell'Ottocento e Novecento, De Ferrari Editore, Genova, 2014 (ad vocem)
 www.pittoriliguri.info per notizie e quotazioni a cura di IDAL800900 Istituto Documentazione Arte Ligure dell'Ottocento e Novecento

1859 births
1918 deaths
19th-century Italian painters
Italian male painters
20th-century Italian painters
20th-century Italian male artists
Painters from Genoa
Orientalist painters
Fresco painters
19th-century Italian male artists